The 2011 Rugby Football League Championship is known as Co-operative Championship due to sponsorship by The Co-operative Group.

The 2011 Co-operative Championship is a semi-professional rugby league football competition played in the UK and France one tier below the first tier Super League. The two worst performing teams during the season, with the exception of Toulouse Olympique, will be relegated to Championship 1.

There is no automatic promotion from this league to Super League, which uses a licensing system renewed every three years. Qualifying for the Grand Final or winning the Northern Rail Cup is a prerequisite for Championship clubs to be able to apply for a licence in the next round of applications for the 2012–14 period.

All of the teams in the 2011 Co-operative Championship will also compete in the 2011 Challenge Cup where they will enter in the third round. All of the teams will also compete in the 2011 National League Cup which starts before the Co-operative Championship with the finals held mid season.

Teams

This competition features mostly the same teams as it did in 2010. The Hunslet Hawks and York City Knights were promoted from the 2010 Championship 1 while the Keighley Cougars and Whitehaven were relegated.

Season standings

Season results

Regular season

Play-offs
Elimination play-offs

Qualifying semi-final

Elimination semi-final

Elimination final

Grand Final

Statistics
The following are the top points scorers in the Championship during the 2011 season. Statistics also include tries and goals scored in the play-offs.

Most tries

Most goals

Most points

See also
 Co-operative Championship
 2011 Championship 1
 British rugby league system
 Super League
 Rugby League Conference
 Northern Ford Premiership
 National League Cup
 Rugby League Reserve Team Championship

References

2011 in English rugby league
2011 in French rugby league
Rugby Football League Championship